Penny Bovell (born 1956) is a Western Australian artist.
In 1999, Bovell received a master's degree in Fine Art from the University of Western Australia, Perth, following her completion in 1993 of a postgraduate diploma in Visual Arts from Curtin University.

She has exhibited regularly, as well as lectured in studio practice and art history at the University of Western Australia and Curtin University in Perth.

Bovell's artwork is in major public collections such as:
 the National Gallery of Australia, Canberra
 Parliament House, Canberra
 the Art Gallery of Western Australia, Perth
 Wesfarmers
as well as numerous private and corporate collections.

References

External links
 

1956 births
Living people
Artists from Perth, Western Australia
Artists from Western Australia
20th-century Australian women artists
20th-century Australian artists
21st-century Australian women artists
21st-century Australian artists